Pseudohelenoconcha spurca is an extinct species of small air-breathing land snail, a terrestrial pulmonate gastropod mollusk in the family Endodontidae.

This species was found only in Saint Helena, (an island in the middle of the south Atlantic). This species is now considered to be extinct.

References

Endodontidae
Extinct gastropods
Gastropods described in 1844
Taxa named by George Brettingham Sowerby I
Taxonomy articles created by Polbot